Minor histocompatibility antigen H13 is a protein that in humans is encoded by the HM13 gene.

Function 

The minor histocompatibility antigen 13 is a nonamer peptide that originates from a protein encoded by the H13 gene. The peptide is generated by the cytosol by the proteasome, enters the endoplasmic reticulum (ER) lumen by the transporter associated with antigen processing (TAP) and is presented on the cell surface on H2-Db major histocompatibility antigen I (MHC I) molecules. The alloreactivity, which leads to transplant rejection in mice, is conferred by Val/Ile polymorphism in the ‘SSV(V/I)GVWYL’ peptide. The orthologue gene in humans is called HM13. If a related polymorphism exists, and if the HM13 serves as a Minor histocompatibility antigen, however, remains to be addressed.

The protein encoded by the M13/HM13 gene is the signal peptide peptidase (SPP), an ER-resident intramembrane protease.
SPP localizes to the endoplasmic reticulum, catalyzes intramembrane proteolysis of some signal peptides after they have been cleaved from a preprotein. This activity is required to generate signal sequence-derived human lymphocyte antigen-E epitopes that are recognized by the immune system, and to process hepatitis C virus core protein. The encoded protein is an integral membrane protein with sequence motifs characteristic of the presenilin-type aspartic proteases. Multiple transcript variants encoding several different isoforms have been found for this gene.

References

Further reading